Ryan Mingachos (born May 27, 1998) is an American college soccer player who plays for George Mason University.

Career

College 
Midway through the 2016 USL season, Mingachos committed to play college soccer for the George Mason Patriots men's soccer program. Mingachos was an immediate starter for the Patriots and the only freshman to appear in all 16 regular season matches for George Mason during the 2016 NCAA Division I men's soccer season. Mingachos captained the team during his junior and senior years. He finished his collegiate career making 66 appearances, scoring 14 goals.

Senior 
Mingachos made his debut for the New York Red Bulls II as amateur contract player on July 30, 2016 against the Richmond Kickers. He came on as a 90th-minute substitute for Kevin O'Toole as the Red Bulls II lost 2–1.

Career statistics

References

External links 
 George Mason Profile
 Top Drawer Soccer Profile

1998 births
Living people
American soccer players
Association football forwards
George Mason Patriots men's soccer players
New York Red Bulls II players
Soccer players from Connecticut
Sportspeople from Danbury, Connecticut
Sportspeople from Fairfield County, Connecticut
USL Championship players